Teya may refer to:
Teya, Burma, in Taungtha Township of Myingyan District in Mandalay Region of Burma
 Teya people, an extinct Native American tribe from Texas
Teya Municipality, a municipality in Yucatán, Mexico
Teya, Mexico, the seat of that municipality
Teya, Russia, a rural locality (a settlement) in Severo-Yeniseysky District of Krasnoyarsk Krai, Russia
Hacienda San Ildefonso Teya, a former henequen plantation in Yucatán, Mexico.
Teya, a Serbian-Austrian singer and songwriter.